Birch Creek is a stream in Menominee County, Michigan, in the United States. It is a tributary of Springer Creek.

Birch Creek was named from groves of black birch near the stream.

See also
List of rivers of Michigan

References

Rivers of Menominee County, Michigan
Rivers of Michigan